Typhoon Holly, known in the Philippines as Typhoon Isang, affected South Korea, Japan, and the Soviet Union during August 1984. Holly originated from the monsoon trough that extended eastward from its original position in mid-August 1984. Over a period of several days, the system slowly became better organized as it tracked westward, although the system did not initially develop a well-defined center. On August 15, a tropical depression was declared, and on the next day, the depression was upgraded into Tropical Storm Holly. Holly slowly gained strength, becoming a typhoon on August 17 as it passed near Okinawa. The typhoon turned northwest and then north as it rounded a subtropical ridge. Shortly after its peak, Holly accelerated northeast due to the westerlies in the general direction of the Korean Peninsula. Land interaction with South Korea triggered a weakening trend, and after entering the Sea of Japan, Holly began to transition into an extratropical cyclone. Thunderstorm activity quickly decreased near the center, and by August 21, Holly had completed its extratropical transition.

In advance of the typhoon, ferry service between Jeju and mainland South Korea was called off, prompting 800 fishing boats to seek shelter. Throughout South Korea, nine people were killed or missing and hundreds lost their homes. At least 10 fishing boats were destroyed and hundreds of hectares of farmland were inundated. Across the Ryukyu Islands, 15,000 air travelers were stranded, including 14,000 from Okinawa when 23 flights were canceled. Between the Ryukyu Islands and the rest of Japan, ferry service was discontinued for two days, which resulted in 21,000 stranded passengers. Overall, one person was killed due to high waves in Nagasaki Prefecture, nine were listed as missing, and eleven were wounded. In all, damage was estimated at US$1 million. The extratropical remnants caused significant flooding in the Russian Far East. Water levels around Khabarovsk rose 10 m (33 ft) along the Amur River, resulting in the evacuation of 64 families, although 2,000 cows and pigs remain stranded. Elsewhere, in Arkhara, a dam along the Amur River burst, which caused the worst flooding in the region since 1928 and resulted in the evacuation of many isolated children by helicopter.

Meteorological history

While Tropical Storm Gerald was forming in the South China Sea, the Western Pacific monsoon trough extended eastward in the middle of August 1984. Organization of the convection gradually improved and satellite imagery indicated that a surface low was forming. The Joint Typhoon Warning Center (JTWC) issued a Tropical Cyclone Formation Alert (TCFA) at 15:15 UTC on August 14. This prompted the Japan Meteorological Agency (JMA) to upgrade the low into a tropical depression.

At noon on August 15, synoptic data suggested that the system did not have a closed circulation; however, ship reports suggested that it was producing gale-force winds at the time. This promoted the JTWC to classify the system as Tropical Storm Holly while the JMA upgraded Holly directly to severe tropical storm. At 00:00 UTC that day, the JTWC upgraded Holly into a typhoon while the storm was located near Okinawa.

After initially tracking westward under the influence of a subtropical ridge, Holly turned northwest for about a 30 hour period before turning north as it rounded the western side of the ridge. Shortly after its peak, Holly turned northeast while also accelerating in response to the westerlies, which sent the storm across the Korean Straits on a collision course with the Korean Peninsula. Land interaction with South Korea resulted in a weakening trend, with both the JTWC and JMA downgrading Holly to a tropical storm. Upon entering the Sea of Japan, Holly began to transition into an extratropical cyclone. The low-level circulation quickly became exposed from the center, and what little convection remained was far removed from the center, and attached to a cold front. At 06:00 UTC on August 21, Holly was declared extratropical by the JMA, with the JTWC following suit 12 hours later. Two days later, the JMA had ceased tracking the cyclone altogether.

Impact
Ferry service between Cheju and the mainland was canceled due to the impeding threat of rough seas, prompting 800 fishing boats to seek shelter. Throughout South Korea, nine people were killed or missing and hundreds lost their homes. At least 10 fishing boats were demolished, hundreds of hectares of farmland were flooded, and several homes were damaged.

Across the Ryukyu Islands, 15,000 air travelers were stranded. In Naha, the main city in Okinawa, an estimated 14,000 tourists were stranded when all 23 scheduled flights to Japanese main islands were canceled. Between the Ryukyu Islands and the Japanese mainland, ferry service was called off for two days, resulting in 21,000 stranded passengers. Further north, in Itsuki, 31 people lost their homes. Forty-one flights were cancelled in Miyazaki Prefecture, which caused an additional 4,200 stranded travelers. Overall, the storm dropped heavy rainfall across much of Japan. A peak rainfall total of  occurred at Ebino, including  in a day. Within 24 hours,  of rain fell in Mount Yonaha, including  an hour. Nation-wide, one person was killed due to high waves in Nagasaki, nine were listed as missing, and eleven were wounded, including nine in Okinawa and the western prefectures of Kumamoto, Nagaski, Yamaguchi, and Hiroshima while two in Aichi Province sustained injuries after strong winds toppled a tree. Property damage was estimated at US$1 million.

The extratropical remnants caused significant flooding in the Russian Far East. Due to the subsequent flooding, 64 families were evacuated, although 2,000 cows and pigs were left stranded. Further west, in Arkhara, a dam along the Amur River burst its banks along a  stretch, resulting in the river's worst flooding since 1928 and the evacuation of many stranded children in helicopters.

See also

Typhoon Pat (1985)

Notes

References

H
H
H
H
H
H
H
H
Holly